The  is a Kofun period burial mound located in the Omi neighborhood of the city of Gyōda, Saitama Prefecture in the Kantō region of Japan. It was designated a National Historic Site of Japan in 1931.

Overview
The tumulus is located within the precincts of Shinkan-ji, a Buddhist temple on the right bank of the Hoshikawa, which flows east through the northern part of Gyōda. The tumulus has a total length of 102 meters and is orientated west-northwest. The main burial chamber is located in the south side of the posterior circular portion and was discovered in 1634. It is an unusually elaborate chamber in that it contained two rooms separated by a monolithic stone with square windows. The front chamber had a length of 2.7 meters, width 2.2 meters and height 2.1 m, and the entrance chamber had a length of 2.4 meters, width 2.2 meters and height 2.1 meters. The burial chamber was constructed of megaliths of schist quarried in the Chichibu region. A second burial chamber for a subsequent burial was located in the saddle area of the tumulus in 1880, and a large number of grave goods, including gold rings, iron swords, bronze ornaments, and earthenware were discovered. These items are now stored at the Tokyo National Museum. Later archaeological excavations revealed that the tumulus had once been surrounded by a moat, from which many fragments of haniwa were recovered. These haniwa and the shape of the mound dates this tumulus to the end of the 6th century to the beginning of the 7th century AD. 

The tumulus is one of four tumuli forming the Omi Kofun Group. The  is another keyhole-shaped tumulus with length of 40 to 50 meters and is a Saitama Prefectural Historic Site. The other two tumuli in the cluster are smaller  circular-type mounds. The Omishinkanji Kofun is located about 15 minutes on foot from Bushū-Araki Station on the Chichibu Railway Chichibu Main Line.

Overall length 102 meters
Posterior circular portion 55 meter diameter x 7.8 meter high
Anterior rectangular portion 48 meters wide x 7 meters high

See also
List of Historic Sites of Japan (Saitama)

References

External links
Gyoda City Board of Education 

Kofun
History of Saitama Prefecture
Gyōda
Archaeological sites in Japan
Historic Sites of Japan